Benelux Film Distributors, also known as Benelux Film Distributors Home Entertainment, BFD and BFDHE, was a joint venture of various independent film distributors founded in 2006. They marketed a wide range of films in cinemas and on home video in the Netherlands, Belgium and Luxembourg. They distributed films by Lumière (Belgium), Inspire Pictures (Netherlands) and Dutch FilmWorks (Netherlands). The company Video/Film Express (Houten, Netherlands), founded in 1991, were merged with BFD on January 1, 2012. Subsequently, BFD had two offices in Ghent, Belgium and Houten.

Movies distributed by BFD included Oorlogswinter, Crusade in Jeans, De Brief voor de Koning, The Bank Job, The Wicker Man, Amazing Grace, The Good Shepherd, Mongol, Le Fils de l'épicier, and Black Out.

The company merged with A-Film in May 2013 and continued as A-Film Benelux B.V. In September 2015, A-Film Benelux B.V. was declared bankrupt.

References 

Film distributors of the Netherlands